Sébastien Ostertag (born 16 March 1979 in Paris) is a French team handball player. He played on the France men's national handball team which won gold medals at the 2009 World Men's Handball Championship in Croatia.

References

French male handball players
1979 births
Living people